The Mercedes-Benz O309 or Angkor Minibus was the bus variant of the Düsseldorfer Transporter, a large capacity van that became available in 1967. During its lifetime, 10 different engines - with four or six cylinders delivering 55-130 hp - were available. The O 309 was the successor of the O 319 and the predecessor of the Mercedes-Benz T2 second generation and the Vario. The internal chassis-designations for the O 309 are 309, 310 and 313.

Models

O 309 Diesel (1967-1986) 

O 309 Petrol (1967-1986)

References

External links

 50 Years of Mercedes-Benz Vans

O309
Vehicles introduced in 1967